Thyanta pallidovirens, the red-shouldered stink bug, is a species of stink bug in the family Pentatomidae. It is found in Central America and North America.

Subspecies
These three subspecies belong to the species Thyanta pallidovirens:
 Thyanta pallidovirens pallidovirens (Stål, 1859)
 Thyanta pallidovirens setosa Ruckes, 1957
 Thyanta pallidovirens spinosa Ruckes, 1957

References

Further reading

External links

 

Articles created by Qbugbot
Insects described in 1859
Pentatomini